Tiffindell Ski Resort is a year-round alpine resort, the only ski resort in South Africa and one of the two ski resorts in Southern Africa.
It was established in 1993 in the Southern Drakensberg, Tiffindell is rated number 19 on CNN's "Top 100 Ski Runs of the World".

Location

International Ski Racing
Tiffindell holds the South African National FIS Championships annually and has successfully run International Ski FIS Races since 2014

Skiing and snowboarding
Tiffindell uses snowmaking and grooming machines to maintain the ski areas.
It offers a snow fun-park with rails and jumps, equipment rentals and friendly instructors.

See also
 Afriski - Lesotho's only ski resort

References
 Tiffindell: Ski South Africa's snow

External links
Mountain passes SA
CNN.com
SnowSports

1993 establishments in South Africa
Ski areas and resorts in South Africa
Sports venues in the Eastern Cape